Of the 7 Connecticut incumbents, 5 were re-elected.

Note: Between the two sources used, there is disagreement over the ordering of the candidates.  Both sources have the same numbers of votes recorded, but disagree on which candidates received those votes, one source lists Goddard as 8th, Talmadge as 9th, etc., as listed here, while the other has them as 11th, 12th, etc., three places off for all of them until the bottom three listed here which are moved up to 8th-10th, suggesting that one of the two sources accidentally misplaced three names on the list. They are ordered here as Goddard and Talmadge in 8th and 9th place as it is more likely that they'd been at the top of the runners-up given that they were subsequently elected to fill vacancies in the 7th Congress.

See also 
 List of United States representatives from Connecticut

1800
Connecticut
United States House of Representatives